Major General Abrar Hussain  (1918–1992) was a Pakistani senior army officer who served in World War II and the Indo-Pakistani War of 1965.

Early life
Major General Abrar Hussain was born on 2 September 1918 in a Taluqdar family of Oudh. He was educated at La Martinière College and Colvin Taluqdars' College where he excelled in both academics and sports.

His excellent personal conduct and exemplary character led the College Principal to declare him as 
"the best boy who has passed through my hands in 10 years."

These qualities would continue to be the hallmark of Abrar Hussain for the rest of his eventful life.

In 1939, he graduated in history, political science and English literature from Allahbad University. On the outbreak of World War II, he joined the Indian Military Academy at Dehradun and was commissioned into the British Indian Army on 31 July 1940 and posted to 2nd Battalion of 10th Baluch Regiment (now 7 Baloch). His brother, Brig. Noor Ahmad Hussain, served as an aide-de-camp (ADC) to Muhammad Ali Jinnah.

World War II
In October 1940, the 2/10th Baluch was dispatched to Malaya in anticipation of the impending war with Japan. On 8 December 1941, Japan invaded Malaya and rapidly overran the British forces, who surrendered on Singapore Island on 15 February 1942. Among the Allied Prisoners of War was 2/10th Baluch, who had given an excellent account of themselves despite the Allied defeat.

The Japanese separated Indian officers and men from the British and subjected them to intense propaganda and pressure to join the Japanese-sponsored 'Indian National Army' (INA). The Baluchis mostly stood firm. Prominent among them was Lieutenant Abrar Hussain, who refused to betray his Honour. The Japanese sent him along with 150 recalcitrant Gurkhas for use as coastal mine-breaching suicide troops on successive island landings. After three such landings, the group arrived on the island of New Britain in the South Pacific, where they were used for building airstrips. Led by their gallant commander, the group remained defiant despite severe privations and cruelty of their Japanese captors.

By 1945, the Allies had severely disrupted Japanese communications in the South Pacific resulting in starvation among the Japanese, who reportedly had turned to cannibalism. Lieutenant Abrar not only managed to survive, but also demanded and received the surrender of the thousand-strong Japanese garrison.
In December 1945, an Australian force arrived in New Britain and were astonished to find it in Allied hands, even if the commander and his men were skeletons in rags, carrying Japanese weapons.
For his exemplary conduct, personal bravery and strength of character, Lieutenant Abrar Hussain was appointed Member of the Order of the British Empire (MBE).

Career in Pakistan Army
On the independence of Pakistan in 1947, Abrar Hussain opted for Pakistan. He joined 2/10th Baluch as a Second Lieutenant. In 1949, he graduated from the Command and Staff College in Quetta. His varied appointments in Pakistan Army included Commander of 17 Baluch (now 19 Baloch), instructor at Staff College and Staff appointments at GHQ, Deputy Director Military Operations, Deputy Director Staff Duties and then Director Staff Duties. Here, he was directly involved from 1955 to 1958 in the induction of US military equipment for modernisation of four infantries and one and a half armoured divisions.

He was promoted Brigadier in 1956. As Military Secretary from 1958 to 1964, he was also President of the Army Reforms Committee. Promoted Major General in 1964, he was given the task of converting 100 (Independent) Armoured Brigade Group into the 6 Armoured Division. The fact that he was an infantry officer and yet had been entrusted with the raising of an armoured formation, speaks volumes of the esteem in which he was held by the Army High Command. He would soon vindicate that confidence in the coming war with India. The 6 Armoured Division was still a paper formation without a division's normal complement of fighting or supporting elements. There were only two armoured regiments and one infantry battalion, while there were no integral brigade headquarters in the division.

The main thrust of the Indian offensive was in the Sialkot Sector, where they attacked with three infantry and one armoured divisions. Facing them was the overstretched 15 Infantry Division. As enemy intentions became clear, and he made inroads towards Chawinda, 6 Armoured Division was inducted into the battle. The 24 Infantry Brigade was provided to General Abrar, and with these meagre resources, he was ordered stop the enemy. For some time, the situation for Pakistan was critical. It was here that his strength of character, calmness and indomitable spirit provided the inspiration to his outnumbered and outgunned troops, who stood firm in the face of overwhelming odds. Some of the fiercest tank battles since World War II were fought on the Battlefield of Chawinda but every attempt by the Indians to breakthrough was foiled. In the words of General KM Arif, who was then a staff officer in 6 Armoured Division:

The Battle of Chawinda produced moments of extreme anxiety and pressure. General Abrar remained composed during the battle, never losing sense of balance and cool nerves. On three occasions when some others got adversely affected, he stood firm and provided leadership of high quality. On 11 September, the enemy attacked the Chawinda defences held by a weak force which had taken over the responsibility only hours earlier. The attackers and defenders suffered considerable losses in the encounter. This was the worst situation faced by 6 Armoured Division in the war. Inspiring the division from the front, Abrar went to the critical part of the frontline, relieved the force with an infantry brigade and stabilised the situation before returning to his Headquarters.

By 22 September, the war would end in ceasefire. Major General Abrar Hussain and his 'Men of Steel' had saved the day for Pakistan. For his inspiring leadership and skillful conduct of operations, he was awarded the Hilal-i-Jur'at. He remains one of Pakistan's most successful field commanders. In 1968, General Abrar was commanding the Command and Staff College in Quetta when he asked for early retirement due to some irreconcilable differences with the GHQ. Typical of him, he never complained or uttered any grievances. On 16 April 1975 during retirement, General Abrar suffered a stroke which paralysed the right side of his body and impeded his speech. He battled against the affliction for seventeen long years with the same quiet dignity and fortitude with which he had lived his life. On 15 March 1992, the grand old soldier and gentleman; one of Pakistan's greatest military heroes, faded away from this world.

Awards and decorations

Foreign decorations

Notes

Further reading
 Ahmad, Lt Col Rifat Nadeem. (2010). Battle Honours of the Baloch Regiment. Abbottabad: The Baloch Regimental Centre.
 Ahmed, Lt Gen Mahmud. (2006). History of Indo-Pak War – 1965. Rawalpindi: Services Book Club.
 Hussain, Maj Gen Abrar. (2005). Men of Steel: 6 Armoured Division in the 1965 War. War Despatches of Major General Abrar Hussain. Rawalpindi: Army Education Publishing House. 
 Riza, Maj Gen Shaukat. (1984). The Pakistan Army: War 1965. Rawalpindi: Services Book Club.

1918 births
1992 deaths
Muhajir people
Pakistani generals
British Indian Army officers
Members of the Order of the British Empire
Recipients of Hilal-i-Jur'at
Baloch Regiment officers
Colvin Taluqdars' College alumni